The 2002 World Military Track and Field Championships were the 40th edition of the international athletics competition between military personnel organised by the CISM (International Military Sports Council). The championships were held in Tivoli, Lazio, Italy from 4–7 September. A total of 30 events were contested, of which 21 by male and 9 by female athletes.

In addition to the track and field competition, the World Military Marathon Championships were held separately on 13–17 June in the Canton of Bern in Switzerland.

The host, Italy, won the most medals, with ten gold medals and twenty medals in total across the two events. Kenya was the runner-up with seven golds in sixteen medals and Germany took third with five golds among its haul of fourteen. Twenty nations reached the medal table in the track and field and marathon competitions.

Medal summary

Men

 Gregor Högler's throw is listed as 75.77 m in the original results, but listed as 77.85 in Tilastopaja results with fourth placed Pekka Alaräisänen recording 77.11 m.

Women

Medal table

Participation

References

Results
40th World Military Track and Field Championship. CISM Mil Sport. Retrieved on 2013-11-10.

World Military Track and Field Championships
World Military Track and Field Championships
World Military Track and Field Championships
International athletics competitions hosted by Italy